Fair Warning is a German hard rock band founded in 1991 by former V2 vocalist Tommy Heart and former Zeno bassist Ule W. Ritgen. The band was rounded out by guitarists Helge Engelke, Andy Malecek and drummer Jurgen "C.C." Behrens.

Discography

Studio albums
Fair Warning (1992)
Rainmaker (1995)
Go! (1997)
Four (2000)
Brother's Keeper (2006)
Aura (2009)
Sundancer (2013)
Pimp Your Past (2016)

Live albums
Live in Japan (1993)
Live at Home (1995)
Live and More (1998)
Talking Ain’t Enough – Fair Warning Live in Tokyo (3 CD, 2 DVD) (2010)
Two Nights to Remember (2019)

Compilation albums
Early Warnings 92–95 (1997)
A Decade of Fair Warning (2001)
Best and More (2012)

Extended plays
In the Ghetto (1993)
Burning Heart (1995)
Angels of Heaven (1996)
Save Me (1997)
Heart on the Run (2000)
Still I Believe (2000)
Don't Keep Me Waiting (2006)

with Kee of Hearts
Kee of Hearts (2017)

References

External links
Official page
Heavy Harmonies page
Rockmeeting

German musical groups
Musical groups established in 1991
Musical groups from Hanover
1991 establishments in Germany
Frontiers Records artists